The Coleta de Dados Colles are a cluster of hills ("colles") on the smooth plains of Sputnik Planitia on Pluto. They actually represent blocks of water ice floating in the denser nitrogen ice of the planitia. The hills were informally named on July 28, 2015 by the research team of the New Horizons mission after the first Brazilian satellite, the Satélite de Coleta de Dados ("Satellite for Data Collecting" in Portuguese). So, the ridge's name means "Data Collecting Colles." The name has yet to be recognized by the IAU.

References
 Um satélite brasileiro em Plutão 
 Primeiro satélite nacional nomeia região em Plutão 

Extraterrestrial hills
Geography of Pluto